Francis Henry Sandbach (23 February 1903 - 18 September 1991), generally known as Harry Sandbach, was a British academic, who held the position of the Professor of Classics at the University of Cambridge, and a Fellow and Senior Tutor of Trinity College.

Early years
Sandbach was the son of Professor Francis Edward Sandbach, then a lecturer in German at the University of Birmingham.

He was educated at King Edward's School, Birmingham and attended Trinity College, Cambridge, where he held the Browne and Craven scholarships in 1923, and was awarded the Chancellor's Medal and the Charles Oldham Classical Scholarship in 1925.

Career
After graduating, he was appointed to an assistant lectureship at the University of Manchester from 1926 to 1929. In 1927 he was awarded a fellowship at Trinity College, Cambridge, and in 1929 left Manchester to take up a lectureship at the college. In 1951 he was appointed as the Brereton Reader in Classics, and in 1967 given a professorship, which he held until his retirement in 1970. In 1968, he was made a Fellow of the British Academy. Within Trinity, he was a tutor from 1945-1952, and senior tutor from 1952–56; in 1940-41 he held the University position of Junior Proctor.

During the Second World War, Sandbach was seconded to the Admiralty in 1943-45, where he worked in the Economic Section of the Topographic Department.

Sandbach produced translations of books VII, IX, XI, and XV of Plutarch's Moralia, published by the Loeb Classical Library, as well as material by Menander. In retirement, he published works on Menander, the Stoics, and Greco-Roman theatre.

Private life
On 9 July 1932 he married the translator Mary Warburton who he had known since his childhood. Their first child died soon after birth, but they had a son and a daughter. Mary died in 1990.

References

1903 births
1991 deaths
Fellows of Trinity College, Cambridge
Alumni of Trinity College, Cambridge
Classical scholars of the University of Cambridge
British classical scholars
Fellows of the British Academy
People educated at King Edward's School, Birmingham